Makahu is a settlement in inland Taranaki, in the western North Island of New Zealand. It is located to the southeast of Strathmore. the Makahu Stream runs south through the area to join with the Mangaehu Stream, which flows into the Patea River.

The name "Makahu" means "White Hawk".

Demographics
The SA1 area is part of the larger Douglas statistical area.

The SA1 area had a population of 204 at the 2018 New Zealand census, an increase of 36 people (21.4%) since the 2013 census, and a decrease of 12 people (−5.6%) since the 2006 census. There were 72 households, comprising 108 males and 96 females, giving a sex ratio of 1.12 males per female. The median age was 35.7 years (compared with 37.4 years nationally), with 54 people (26.5%) aged under 15 years, 30 (14.7%) aged 15 to 29, 87 (42.6%) aged 30 to 64, and 30 (14.7%) aged 65 or older.

Ethnicities were 97.1% European/Pākehā, 11.8% Māori, and 1.5% other ethnicities. People may identify with more than one ethnicity.

Although some people chose not to answer the census's question about religious affiliation, 52.9% had no religion, 38.2% were Christian and 1.5% had other religions.

Of those at least 15 years old, 15 (10.0%) people had a bachelor's or higher degree, and 30 (20.0%) people had no formal qualifications. The median income was $32,900, compared with $31,800 nationally. 18 people (12.0%) earned over $70,000 compared to 17.2% nationally. The employment status of those at least 15 was that 87 (58.0%) people were employed full-time, 27 (18.0%) were part-time, and 6 (4.0%) were unemployed.

Education

Notable people
Kelly Jury, Silver Fern netball player

Notes

Stratford District, New Zealand
Populated places in Taranaki